The 1858 Massachusetts gubernatorial election was held on November 2. Incumbent Republican Governor Nathaniel Banks was easily re-elected to a second term in office, beginning a period of Republican dominance which would extended into the 1870s.

General election

Candidates
 Nathaniel Prentiss Banks, incumbent Governor (Republican)
 Erasmus Beach, nominee for Governor in 1855, 1856, and 1857 (Democratic)
 Amos Adams Lawrence, businessman and textile magnate (American)

Results

See also
 1858 Massachusetts legislature

References

Governor
1858
Massachusetts
November 1858 events